The cultural calendar of Cornwall is punctuated by numerous historic and community festivals and celebrations. In particular there are strong links between parishes and their patronal feast days (which are often days not directly linked to official church patronal celebrations). There is also a tradition of holding celebrations associated with tin mining and fishing.

Modern community festivals 
Since the 1980s there has been a development of community based festivals in Cornwall often named after a famous local resident. These have included Murdoch day in Redruth, the Daphne du Maurier Festival in Fowey, Trevithick Day in Camborne and the Montol Festival in Penzance. Other modern festivals include, Falmouth oyster festival, Newlyn fish festival, Lowender Peran in Perranporth, Dehwelans Kernow and many more.

In Moonta, South Australia, the Kernewek Lowender (Cornish for "Cornish happiness") is the largest Cornish festival in the world and attracts tens of thousands of visitors each year.

Historic festivals 

The following list is of festivals celebrated past and present in Cornwall which can be traced back over 100 years or more; often these celebrations have considerable antiquity. These have been classified separately to the above because they form a part of a Cornish indigenous culture. There have been attempts and successes to revive these celebrations where they have fallen into disuse. Today many of these ceremonies are kept alive by members of the Federation of Old Cornwall Societies.

† = Parish feast day

References 

 Charles Henderson "Celtic Kalendar: giving the feast days of most of the parishes in the Diocese" in: Cornish Church Guide (1925) Truro: Blackford; pp. 9–16

 
Cornish culture
Festivals in Cornwall
Cornish